In college football, the Flea Kicker was a notable play executed by the Nebraska Cornhuskers against the Missouri Tigers on November 8, 1997 that sent the game into overtime and resulted in a win for the Cornhuskers who went on to share the NCAA Division I-A National Championship with the Michigan Wolverines. The final minutes of the game were seen by many people on ABC, after other regional games ended.

Background
The Cornhuskers, who had won national championships for the 1994 and 1995 seasons, went into the game with an 8–0 record and a No. 1 ranking in the AP Poll. They had only given up seven points in their last three games and had beaten the Tigers eighteen straight times. The Tigers were unranked with a 6–3 record, and in the school’s history, had never beaten a No. 1 ranked team.

The play
In the fourth quarter, Tigers quarterback Corby Jones completed a pass to Eddie Brooks to give Missouri a 38–31 lead, giving Missouri fans hope that they would beat Nebraska for the first time since 1978 and moving coach Larry Smith to tears. After Missouri failed to convert a first down, the Huskers took possession from a punt on their own 33-yard line with 1:02 left. In less than a minute, the Huskers moved the ball 55 yards. The Huskers were on the Missouri 12-yard line with only seven seconds left when Nebraska quarterback Scott Frost threw a pass intended for wingback Shevin Wiggins. The ball hit Wiggins directly in the chest near the goal line. The ball immediately shot down and hit a Missouri safety in the foot and popped back in the air. Then Missouri safety Julian Jones tackled Wiggins as time expired. As Wiggins was pulled to the ground, his leg popped up, kicking the ball into the air for a second time. Cornhuskers receiver Matt Davison leaped for the ball, his hands scraping the turf as he managed to make the catch in the endzone for a touchdown. Missouri fans stormed the field in celebration, thinking they had won.

The play could have resulted in a 15-yard penalty (illegal kick) if officials had considered the kick intentional. Instead, they ruled the catch a touchdown. Once fans were cleared from the field, Kris Brown kicked the extra point for Nebraska to send the game into overtime. In OT, Frost ran for a touchdown, and Jones was sacked on 4th and seven by Grant Wistrom to give Nebraska a 45–38 win.

Aftermath
Missouri finished the season 7–5 with a loss to Colorado State in the Holiday Bowl. The Tigers did not defeat the Cornhuskers until 2003, ending a 24-game losing streak in the series.

After the game, Wiggins claimed to have kicked the ball intentionally to keep the play alive, and some of his statements indicate that he did so to keep the ball away from Missouri defenders. He also at various times and in later interviews claimed to have been trying to kick the ball back to himself for a catch. Regardless, the outcome of the game could not be changed after the fact, even though the kick led to Nebraska's win. The legality of the play remains in dispute among college football fans and experts, as NCAA rules at the time generally made it illegal for an intentional kick (by players other than kickers and punters) but also allowed players to use any part of their bodies - including feet - to help themselves catch a forward pass. Furthermore, the rules only allowed officials to establish intent to kick only as they could determine clearly on the field of play.

Although Nebraska dropped to No. 3 in the AP Poll the following week, they were still undefeated, and national title hopes were still alive. The Cornhuskers defeated Iowa State and Colorado in the last two games of the regular season and beat Texas A&M 54–15 in the Big 12 Championship Game. Nebraska went on to defeat Peyton Manning and No. 3 Tennessee 42–17 in the 1998 Orange Bowl to finish the season 13–0. The Cornhuskers had a No. 1 ranking in the Coaches Poll, giving them a third national championship in four seasons. However, they had to split the championship with the 12–0 Michigan Wolverines who defeated No. 8 Washington State 21–16 in the 1998 Rose Bowl and ended the season topping the AP Poll.

Significance
The Flea Kicker was ranked No. 11 on The Best Damn Sports Show Period'''s list of Top 50 Amazing Catches.

The Flea Kicker was also being recreated for the Fox Sports Net program Sport Science'' in an episode called "Bet You Can't Do It Again".

See also
Missouri–Nebraska football rivalry
Fifth Down Game (1990)

References 

1997 Big 12 Conference football season
Nebraska Cornhuskers football games
Missouri Tigers football games
American football incidents
College football controversies
American football plays
Events in Columbia, Missouri
20th century in Columbia, Missouri
November 1997 sports events in the United States
1997 in sports in Missouri
Sports in Columbia, Missouri